Christen Annemarie Press (born December 29, 1988) is an American soccer player for Angel City FC of the National Women's Soccer League (NWSL) and the United States national team. She first appeared for the United States national team during an international friendly against Scotland on February 9, 2013. She has made 155 appearances for her country and is currently ninth all-time with 64 goals scored.

Press was the recipient of the Hermann Trophy in 2010 and holds the all-time scoring and assists records at Stanford Cardinal. Following her collegiate career, Press was selected fourth overall by the Washington Freedom in the 2011 WPS Draft, where she was named WPS Rookie of the Year. She was the Damallsvenskan's top scorer in 2013 with 23 goals scored for Tyresö FF and became the first American to earn the Golden Boot award in the history of the Swedish League.

Press has played for the Chicago Red Stars and Utah Royals in the National Women's Soccer League (NWSL), Kopparbergs/Göteborg FC and Tyresö FF in the Swedish Damallsvenskan, magicJack in Women's Professional Soccer (WPS) and Manchester United of the English FA Women's Super League. She helped the United States win their titles at the 2015 and 2019 FIFA Women's World Cup. In 2019, she co-founded a gender-neutral lifestyle brand, re-inc, with fellow athletes Megan Rapinoe, Tobin Heath, and Meghan Klingenberg.

Early life
Born in Los Angeles to Cody and Stacy Press, Christen was raised in the suburb of Palos Verdes Estates with her two sisters, Channing and Tyler. Both of her parents played different sports: Cody was an American football player at Dartmouth and Stacy was a tennis player. She began playing soccer at age five and later attended Chadwick School for high school.

As a two-year team captain and four-year starter of her high school's soccer team, Press led Chadwick to two Southern Section Division IV titles. She also lettered in track and tennis.
In 2006, she was named NSCAA High School All-American and Parade Magazine All-American. During her high school career, she scored 128 goals, including 38 her junior year alone (a school record). She was named Southern Section Division IV Offensive Player of the Year twice and was a four-time Prep League Offensive MVP.

Press played club soccer for Slammers FC of Newport Beach, California and won the Golden Boot for most goals scored in the US Youth Soccer Association's national championship tournament.

Stanford Cardinal (2007–2010)
Press is the all-time leading scorer for the Stanford Cardinal women's soccer team with 71 goals. While playing for the Cardinal, she broke school records for career points (183), assists (41), and shots (500); as well as single-season records for goals (26), shots (180), and game-winning goals (10). She was Stanford's second Hermann Trophy winner and a two-time runner-up at the NCAA Women's College Cup.

As a freshman, Press started 18 games for Stanford. She led the team in assists (6) and ranked second in goals (8), points (22) and shots (60). One of her biggest highlights of the year came in the first round of the NCAA College Cup when she scored the fastest goal in team history in the 37th second of the match. She scored twice and also assisted on another goal in the team's 7–0 victory. Press was named Pac-10 Freshman of the Year and earned first-team Freshman All-American honors.

During her sophomore year, Press was one of only five players in the squad to start every game of the season. She scored 16 goals and had 11 assists, while her total of 43 points ranked second in school history. In the College Cup quarterfinal against the Portland Pilots, Press scored the lone goal of the match in the 86th minute to send the Cardinal to the Final Four. She was the only player from the Cardinal squad to be named to the NCAA College Cup All-Tournament Team.

During her third season with the Cardinal, Press set new program records for assists (16) and shots (143). Seven of her 21 goals during the 2009 season were game-winning goals. Her 58 points raised the bar that she set during the previous season for the second-highest point total in a single season and ranked third in the nation. Press also broke her previous record for fastest goal scored in Stanford history after scoring 23 seconds into a match against BYU. In the College Cup, she scored the golden goal and had an assist in the Cardinal's 2–1 overtime win against the UCLA Bruins to send them into their first-ever cup final. They went on to lose the final to the North Carolina Tar Heels, after Press's apparent game-tying goal in the 89th minute was ruled offside. At the end of the season, Press was named to the All-Pac-10 first team and was a semi-finalist for the Hermann Trophy.

In her senior year, Press was the recipient of the 2010 Hermann Trophy for being the nation's top college soccer player. This marked the second consecutive win for a Stanford player following Kelley O'Hara in 2009. Press led the nation in both goals and points, while the club obtained a 23–1–2 record overall. Their only loss in 2010 came in the last match of the season in the College Cup final, which was Stanford's second consecutive runner-up finish. Press was also named Soccer America Player of the Year, Pac-10 Player of the Year, and earned All-Pac-10 first team and National Soccer Coaches Association of America (NSCAA) first-team All-American honors. She displayed academic proficiency as well, receiving Academic All-America honors and winning the Pac-10's Scholar-Athlete of the Year for soccer.

Stanford statistics

Source

Club career

magicJack (2011)

Press was drafted to the Washington Freedom as the fourth overall pick in the 2011 WPS Draft. Under new ownership, the team moved to Florida and was renamed magicJack. She scored her first goal in the 64th minute of magicJack's 2–0 victory over the Atlanta Beat in May. Of the goal, Press said, "It was so good to finish. Being a forward, we go into every game thinking our job is to score, so it's nice to finally get that accomplished." During a 4–0 win against the Boston Breakers in July, Press scored her first hat trick in a professional match. After losing in the semifinal of the playoffs, she was awarded the U.S. Soccer Federation's Rookie of the Year award in part for being the first-ever rookie to have a hat trick. Press finished the season having started in 16 of the 19 games in which she appeared for magicJack. Her eight goals ranked third in the league. During the offseason, Press signed with the Atlanta Beat; however, the league suspended operations before the season began.

Kopparbergs/Göteborg FC (2012)
After Women's Professional Soccer folded in early 2012, Press signed a new professional contract with Kopparbergs/Göteborg FC in the Damallsvenskan, the top division league in Sweden. Her first game with Göteborg was a 2012–13 UEFA Women's Champions League quarterfinal match against Arsenal that ended in a 3–0 loss.

During her regular season debut with Göteborg on April 10 against Djurgården, she scored two goals (a brace), with her first goal coming in the fifth minute of the match. Later in the month, she scored another brace, this time with the goals scored five minutes apart in the team's 6–0 victory over KIF Örebro. In August, Press recorded her third brace, this time scoring two minutes apart as Göteborg defeated Umeå 5–0. Press ended the year as the second-highest scorer in the Damallsvenskan with 17 league goals, behind only Anja Mittag, and scored a total of 25 in all competitions.

During the quarterfinals of the Swedish Cup, Press scored two goals in a 3–0 victory over Kristianstad. In the semifinals, her thirteenth-minute goal helped Göteborg defeat LdB Malmö 2–1 and progress to the championship final. Göteborg won the championship over Tyresö FF by a score of 2–1 after extra time, with Press involved in both goals. She scored in the ninth minute of the game and then drew a penalty in the added time, which Marlene Sjöberg converted to secure the cup.

Tyresö FF (2013–2014)

In early 2013, Press signed with Damallsvenskan champions, Tyresö FF, in Stockholm. For the second consecutive season, she scored a goal in her regular season debut. Press scored four goals in a 10–2 win over Sunnanå SK. During the team's next match, she scored two goals helping the team defeat Jitex BK 7–0. On June 9, 2013, she scored a hat trick during the squad's 5–1 win over Kristianstads DFF. After following up with a pair of goals scored in each of Tyresö's next two matches, Press scored her second and third hat tricks of the season, the second in a 5–0 win over Jitex IK on August 24, and the following in an eventual 8–0 win against Sunnanå IF. During the team's last match of the regular season, Press scored twice against her former team, Göteborg FC, helping Tyresö win 4–1.

Press finished the season as the top scorer in the league with 23 goals, becoming the first American to do so in the history of the Damallsvenskan. Tyresö finished second during the regular season with a 14–6–2 record and thus qualified for the 2014–15 UEFA Women's Champions League. In October, Press scored Tyresö's only two goals during the 2013–14 UEFA Women's Champions League's Round of 32 match, securing a 2–1 aggregate win over French side Paris Saint-Germain Féminines, and sending her team to the Round of 16. In 2013, she scored three times in the Svenska Cupen and nine times in the 2013–14 UEFA Women's Champions League competitions, for a total goal tally of 37. Her nine goals scored in the Champions League helped lift the team to the 2014 UEFA Women's Champions League Final where they lost 4–3 to VfL Wolfsburg.

Chicago Red Stars (2014–2017)

In January 2014, the Chicago Red Stars announced that Press would be joining their roster for the 2014 season following the conclusion of her time with Tyresö in the 2013–14 Champions League. After Press joined the team in late May (two months into the 2014 NWSL season), she scored a team-high of six goals while playing in only 12 matches and was awarded the team's Golden Boot. During a match on July 4 against reigning champions Portland Thorns FC at Providence Park, she scored two goals in the last fifteen minutes to equalize the score, after being down 2–0 at halftime. On August 16, she scored another brace with goals in the 17th and 60th minutes helping Chicago draw 3–3 against Western New York Flash. Chicago finished fifth during the regular season with a  record. Press was named to the league's second XI team by players, coaches, and media.

Press returned to the Chicago Red Stars for the 2015 season. During the team's first home match against Seattle Reign FC, she scored a brace and assisted a goal scored by Jen Hoy, resulting in a 3–2 win. She was subsequently named the league's NWSL Player of the Week for week two of the season. On April 25, Press scored two early goals in a drawn match against Portland. At the end of April, having recorded four goals and one assist, Press was the league's goal leader and was named NWSL Player of the Month. Press missed the next eight games due to her participation in the 2015 FIFA Women's World Cup. After returning, she scored four goals in a three-game span, including a brace in the Red Stars' 2–2 draw with FC Kansas City on August 1.

During the 2016 season, Press was named captain and tallied eight goals in 14 games. She scored a goal in the NWSL Playoffs, though the Red Stars were eliminated after a 2–1 loss to the Washington Spirit in extra time.

Press captained the team for a second season in 2017. She was the top scorer on the team with 11 goals and the fourth highest scorer in the league. Chicago finished in fourth place during the regular season with an  record, securing a berth to the playoffs. The team was defeated by regular season winners North Carolina Courage 1–0 during the semi-finals. Press was named to the NWSL Best XI at the end of the season.

On January 18, 2018, Press was traded to the Houston Dash as part a three-team trade which also included Carli Lloyd and Samantha Kerr. On March 10, the Dash were informed that Press would not be joining the club and had multiple offers in Sweden.

Kopparbergs/Göteborg FC (2018)
In March 2018, Press signed a three-month contract with her former club Kopparbergs/Göteborg FC, though the Dash still held her NWSL rights. After scoring four goals in three games, Press was named Damallsvenskan Player of the Month for April. In May, she scored a brace in the team's 3–1 win against IF Limhamn Bunkeflo. On June 19, the team announced an agreement with NWSL expansion club, Utah Royals FC, to end her contract early so she could join the Royals for the remainder of the 2018 season.

Utah Royals FC (2018–2020)
On June 18, Utah Royals FC announced they had acquired the rights to Press in a trade that sent Brooke Elby and six draft picks to the Chicago Red Stars. She made her debut on June 27 in a 0–0 draw against the Seattle Reign. Press appeared in 11 games during the Royals' 2018 season, and scored 2 goals. The Royals finished in fifth place during their inaugural season, missing a berth to the NWSL Playoffs by two points.

Press began the 2019 NWSL season assisting Lo'eau LaBonta's goal in a 1–0 over the Washington Spirit in Utah's season opener. The following week, Press scored the only goal in 1–0 Royals victory over the Orlando Pride. Press was named to the NWSL Team of the Month for April. She recorded a goal or assist in her first five games of the season but, due to her participation in the 2019 Women's World Cup and subsequent Victory Tour, missed 11 Utah games during the season. Press was named NWSL Player of the Week for Week 17 and later named NWSL Player of the Month for August, her second player of the month award. Press finished second on the team in scoring with 8 goals and was named to the end of season NWSL Best XI, her fourth time being named to the Best XI.

With the 2020 season disrupted by the COVID-19 pandemic, Press elected not to participate in the 2020 NWSL Challenge Cup.

On November 12, 2020, having left Press unprotected, Utah lost her NWSL rights to Racing Louisville FC during the 2020 NWSL Expansion Draft.

Manchester United (2020–2021)
On September 9, 2020, Manchester United announced they had signed Press and her national team teammate Tobin Heath to one-year contracts. She made her debut on October 4 as a 77th minute substitute in a 3–0 victory over Brighton & Hove Albion. She scored her first goal for the club on October 18 as part of a 4–2 WSL victory away to West Ham United. On January 31, 2021, Press scored her second goal for the club in a 2–0 away victory against Everton. She scored during a 2–0 victory against West Ham United on March 27, 2021, the team's first match played at Old Trafford. On June 24, the club announced Press would leave upon the expiry of her contract at the end of the month.

Angel City FC (2021–present)
On August 23, 2021, Racing Louisville traded the NWSL playing rights of Press to Angel City FC having acquired them in the 2020 NWSL Expansion Draft. In return they received Angel City's first-round pick in the 2022 NWSL Draft, $75,000 in allocation money and roster protection from Angel City in the 2021 NWSL Expansion Draft. She signed a two-year contract with an optional third year, reportedly worth a total of $700,000, making Press one of the highest-paid players in NWSL history.

International career

2012
As a member of the United States women's national soccer team player pool, Press was named to the squad for the 2012 Summer Olympics in London, though she attended as an alternate, and did not make the final roster.

2013

She earned her first cap for the national team on February 9 in a friendly against Scotland. After scoring the first two goals of the match playing as a right midfielder, she provided the assist on the United States' third goal. Press is only the third woman to score two goals on her first match for the United States national team following Cindy Parlow Cone in 1996 and Sherrill Kester in 2000. The United States defeated Scotland 4–1 and Press was named Budweiser Woman of the Match. Four days later, she scored another goal during her second cap, helping the United States defeat Scotland 2–0. No other American woman has scored three goals in her first two games. Press' third cap for the national team occurred at the 2013 Algarve Cup during the team's first group stage match against Iceland on March 6, 2013. Press subbed in during the 64th minute for Carli Lloyd and the U.S. defeated Iceland 3–0. During the team's next group stage match on March 8, 2013, Press scored the fourth goal in a commanding 5–0 win over China. With the goal against China, Press became the fifth women's national team player to score at least four goals in her first four matches. She earned two additional caps at the Algarve during the knockout stage match against Sweden led by former United States coach, Pia Sundhage, and started in the final against Germany. The United States took first at the 2013 Algarve Cup with a 2–0 win over Germany. Press finished her first year with the senior national team with eight goals in 12 matches.

2014

Press scored a career-high 11 goals (and ranked third-best on the national team) in 2014. During a group stage match against Argentina at the 2014 International Tournament of Brasília, she scored four goals helping the United States win 7–0, and qualify for the championship game. Earlier in the year, she scored a goal against Russia in a friendly on February 8, 2014, and again on February 13, 2014. She was selected by national team head coach Tom Sermanni to play at the 2014 Algarve Cup. In October, Press featured in the 2014 CONCACAF Women's Championship where the team won the tournament.

2015: FIFA Women's World Cup
Press was named to the national team squad for the 2015 FIFA Women's World Cup in Canada. On June 8, she made her first tournament start against Australia and scored her first World Cup goal in the 61st minute. She played in four of the team's seven games, starting two, helping the United States progress to the 2015 FIFA Women's World Cup Final. The United States won the tournament after defeating Japan 5–2.

2016: Summer Olympics
Press was selected as one of the 18 members of the Summer Olympics team. After the team advanced to the knockout stages, they lost in the quarter finals to Sweden. After a 1–1 draw, they lost 4–3 on a penalty shootout with Press missing the team's decisive final kick. Supporters on social media started the #DogsforChristen hashtag to cheer her up and it became a trending worldwide topic on Twitter. Press competed in all four of the team's matches and was a starting forward in the 2–2 draw against Colombia.

Press was one of two United States players to appear in all 25 games in 2016. She finished the year with 12 goals, which was the third straight year she recorded double-figure goals and was her best goal-scoring record on the team. She became the fifth player in team history to score double-figure goals for three consecutive years, joining Mia Hamm, Abby Wambach, Tiffeny Milbrett, and Carli Lloyd in the team record books.

2017

In 2017 Press once again appeared in every game for the United States and was one of only three players to do so. She scored the only goal in a 1–0 win over Norway in a June friendly. At the 2017 Tournament of Nations held in three different venues in California and Washington, Press scored a goal in the 80th minute against Brazil to lift the United States score deficit to 3–2. Five minutes later, she provided the assist to Megan Rapinoe's equalizer. With an additional goal from Julie Ertz, the team turned the game around for a 4–3 win. She finished 2017 with three goals and three assists.

2018
Press was named to the roster for the 2018 SheBelieves Cup in February. The United States won the tournament for the second time. After she was traded against her wishes to the Houston Dash, Press declined to join the team and was reportedly considering multiple offers from Swedish clubs. She was subsequently left off the U.S roster for a set of friendlies against Mexico in April 2018, with head coach Jill Ellis stating: "We've had several conversations and [Press] understands our expectations are that a consistent training and match environment for a professional is an important factor for selection into women's national team rosters...I am certain that once Christen transitions to a new team, she will embrace being back on the pitch and will help her team be successful."

After signing with Kopparbergs/Göteborg FC at the end of March, Press was called up to the next United States camp in June for a set of friendlies against China. On June 12, Press became the 37th female player in U.S history to play in 100 games for the US Women's National Team. She had two assists in the game as the United States won 2–1. On August 31, Press was honored for her 100th cap during a friendly against Chile in her hometown of Los Angeles and captained the team. She scored a goal in the 59th minute and the United States won 3–0.

In September, Press was named to the 20-player squad for the 2018 CONCACAF Women's Championship. She recorded a goal and two assists in a 5–0 victory over Panama in the group stage. The United States won their second consecutive CONCACAF Championship and earned a berth to the 2019 FIFA Women's World Cup in France.

2019
In January 2019, Press scored the only goal in a 1–0 victory over Spain in a friendly in Alicante. At the 2019 SheBelieves Cup she assisted on Alex Morgan's goal, one minute after entering the game. A month later in a friendly against Belgium, Press recorded 3 assists in a 6–0 victory.

2019 FIFA Women's World Cup
On May 2, 2019, Press was named to the final 23–player roster for the 2019 FIFA Women's World Cup—this was her second time to play for the Cup.

Press appeared in all three group stage games and started and played the full 90 minutes in the second group match against Chile. She was a second-half substitute in both the Round of 16 and the quarter-final matches. Press started the semi-final match against England and scored a goal in the 10th minute, to put the USA ahead 1–0, the United States would go on to win 2–1, advancing to their third straight World Cup Final. Press appeared in the World Cup Final as a second-half substitute replacing Megan Rapinoe. She was one of four U.S players to play in all seven World Cup games. The United States defeated the Netherlands 2–0 in the Final, to win their second consecutive World Cup. This was Press' second World Cup win.

On November 7, 2019, Press became the 12th player in USWNT history to score 50 international goals. Her 50th goal occurred in the 28th minute of a friendly against Sweden. The United States won 3-2 and Press also recorded an assist in the game. Press finished 2019 with 5 goals and 12 assists. Her 12 assists lead the team, she was also the only member of the USWNT to appear in all 24 games in 2019.

2020
Press was named to the 20-player roster for the 2020 CONCACAF Olympic Qualifying tournament, which was her second time participating in Olympic qualifying. Press scored in all three group stage games, including two goals against Costa Rica. She also scored in the semi-final against Mexico. After the United States defeated Canada in the Championship game, Press was awarded the Golden Ball as the tournaments best player. Press was named to the United States' 23-player roster for the 2020 SheBelieves Cup, where she appeared in all three matches. She was joint top scorer of the tournament notching two goals, one against England on March 5 and one against Japan on March 11. She also registered the assist on a game-winning goal against Spain on March 8, delivering a set piece to teammate Julie Ertz. The United States won the tournament, having won all three of their matches. Press was named to the roster when the United States traveled to the Netherlands to face off in a friendly on November 27 in Breda. The team won 2-0 and Press registered another international assist on a goal scored by Rose Lavelle. Press lead the team in goals total with seven scored, in which she was tied with teammate Lindsey Horan, and registered three assists in 2020.

2021
After missing a series of friendlies against Colombia in January through illness, Press was recalled to the USWNT squad in February for the 2021 SheBelieves Cup. She appeared in all three games and scored twice in victories over Brazil and Argentina as the United States retained the SheBelieves Cup. In June 2021, Press was named in the 18-player United States Women's soccer team roster for the delayed 2020 Tokyo Olympics. She appeared in all six matches for the United States in the tournament, which saw the team take home the bronze medal on August 5 following their 4–3 victory over Australia. Press scored and also forced an own-goal in the team's 6-1 group stage win over New Zealand on July 24, and converted a penalty kick in the team's quarter-final shootout win over the Netherlands on July 30. Press tallied a total of six goals and five assists in 2021 for the United States.

2021– 
Press announced via social media on September 9, 2021, that she, despite being called up, would not take part in the upcoming international windows, stating that she needed a few months break to focus on her mental health and spiritual growth. Ahead of two abroad friendlies vs Australia in November 2021, USWNT head coach Vlatko Andonovski opted to leave a core group of veteran players off of his 22-player roster, which included Press. As a result of this decision, Press subsequently was not included in the 23-player roster for the 2022 SheBelieves Cup in February. On June 13, 2022, Press was not included in the 23-player roster ahead of the 2022 CONCACAF W Championship. This decision sparked some confusion amongst media and fans, many of whom questioned Andonovski after Press had been logging consistent minutes for Angel City FC in the months leading up. When questioned by reporters on omitting Press, Andonovski claimed that she was performing well, but not out-performing the players in front of her. Press ultimately suffered an ACL tear with her club team on June 11, 2022, and will remain unavailable for national team selection while she recovers.

2021 abuse scandal
On November 22, 2021, amidst the 2021 NWSL abuse scandal, Press alleged abuse against former Chicago Red Stars manager Rory Dames. Press revealed in an article by The Washington Post that she had tried to speak up about Dames' behavior in 2014 to former US Soccer President Sunil Gulati, but her "concerns were dismissed." Press went on to say that her request for a trade from the Chicago Red Stars in 2017 was due to Dames' treatment of her, and in 2018, she filed a complaint against him to US Soccer. That same day of the 22nd, the NWSL's players union released a statement in support of Press and Press' former Red Stars teammates Jen Hoy and Sam Johnson who came forward with similar allegations.

In popular culture

Media and endorsements
Press has appeared in several advertisements and promotional pieces for Nike. In 2014, she was featured in a promo for Wheaties. In May 2015, she starred in television commercials for Coppertone. She became a brand ambassador for nutritional product manufacturer Genesis Today in February 2016. In January 2018, she partnered with Hydrive Energy Water.

Press' likeness appeared on The Simpsons along with teammates Alex Morgan and Abby Wambach in May 2015. The same year, she starred in the short film, An Equal Playing Field. She has been featured in a number of magazines including Self, Howler, Shape, Darling Magazine and Glamour. In 2015, she was featured on the covers of Sports Illustrated and Yoga Digest. In 2016, Press posed nude for the ESPN's annual The Body Issue magazine.

Press was featured with her national teammates in the EA Sports' FIFA video game series in FIFA 16, the first time women players were included in the game. In October 2015, she was announced as a host for FOX Sports' @The Buzzer and led a Chicago Cubs crowd in singing "Take Me Out to the Ballgame" along with teammates Julie Ertz and Lori Chalupny.

Ticker tape parade and White House honor
Following the United States' win at the 2015 FIFA Women's World Cup, Press and her teammates became the first women's sports team to be honored with a ticker tape parade in New York City. Each player received a key to the city from Mayor Bill de Blasio. In October of the same year, the team was honored by President Barack Obama at the White House.

Career statistics

Club

International summary

International goals
 As of match played July 24, 2021. United States score listed first, score column indicates score after each Press goal.

World Cup appearances

Olympic appearances

Honors and awards
Kopparbergs/Göteborg FC
 Swedish Cup: 2012

Tyresö FF
 UEFA Women's Champions League runners-up: 2013–14
United States
 FIFA Women's World Cup: 2015, 2019
 Olympic Bronze Medal: 2020
 CONCACAF Women's Championship: 2014, 2018
 CONCACAF Women's Olympic Qualifying Tournament: 2016; 2020
 Algarve Cup: 2013, 2015
 SheBelieves Cup: 2016, 2018, 2020, 2021
 Tournament of Nations: 2018
Individual
Hermann Trophy: 2010
Pac-10 Conference Player of the Year: 2010
Soccer America Player of the Year Award: 2010
WPS Rookie of the Year: 2011
GT Kristallkulan: 2012 
Damallsvenskan Golden Boot: 2013
NWSL Best XI: 2015, 2016, 2017, 2019 
NWSL Player of the Month: April 2015, August 2019
Damallsvenskan Player of the Month: April 2018 
 CONCACAF Women's Olympic Qualifying Tournament Golden Ball: 2020
CONCACAF Women's Olympic Qualifying Tournament Best XI: 2020

See also

 List of FIFA Women's World Cup winning players
 List of multiple Olympic gold medalists in one event
 List of Olympic medalists in football
 List of players who have won multiple FIFA Women's World Cups
 List of players who have appeared in multiple FIFA Women's World Cups
 List of Chicago Red Stars players
 List of foreign Damallsvenskan players
 List of foreign FA Women's Super League players
 List of Stanford University people
 List of Kappa Alpha Theta sisters
 List of sportswomen

Notes

References

Match reports

Further reading
 Grainey, Timothy (2012), Beyond Bend It Like Beckham: The Global Phenomenon of Women's Soccer, University of Nebraska Press, 
 Lisi, Clemente A. (2010), The U.S. Women's Soccer Team: An American Success Story, Scarecrow Press, 
 Nash, Tim (2016), It's Not the Glory: The Remarkable First Thirty Years of U.S. Women's Soccer, Lulu Press, Inc, 
 Stevens, Dakota (2011), A Look at the Women's Professional Soccer Including the Soccer Associations, Teams, Players, Awards, and More, BiblioBazaar,

External links

 
 
 U.S. Soccer player profile
 
 Utah Royals FC player profile

 
 
 

1988 births
Living people
Stanford Cardinal women's soccer players
United States women's international soccer players
Pali Blues players
MagicJack (WPS) players
USL W-League (1995–2015) players
Expatriate footballers in Sweden
Damallsvenskan players
BK Häcken FF players
Tyresö FF players
Soccer players from Los Angeles
American women's soccer players
Parade High School All-Americans (girls' soccer)
Chicago Red Stars players
National Women's Soccer League players
2015 FIFA Women's World Cup players
FIFA Women's World Cup-winning players
Women's association football forwards
Footballers at the 2016 Summer Olympics
Footballers at the 2020 Summer Olympics
People from Palos Verdes, California
African-American women's soccer players
FIFA Century Club
Hermann Trophy women's winners
2019 FIFA Women's World Cup players
Utah Royals FC players
Manchester United W.F.C. players
Angel City FC players
Women's Super League players
American expatriate sportspeople in England
Olympic bronze medalists for the United States in soccer
Medalists at the 2020 Summer Olympics
21st-century African-American sportspeople
21st-century African-American women
20th-century African-American people
20th-century African-American women
Women's Professional Soccer players